Frédéric-Auguste Laguillermie (27 March 1841, Paris – 14 December 1934, Paris) was a French etcher and painter.

Biography 
He was born to Eugénie, née Hime, and Frédéric-Guillaume Laguillermie (1805–1870), an engraver and printer, who was the associate cartographer for Victor Levasseur. He received his initial training in his father's studio then, in 1861, entered the École des Beaux-Arts, where he studied etching with Léopold Flameng, and painting with William Bouguereau.

In 1862, he became one of the first members of the original , founded by Alfred Cadart, who published several of his early plates. His first exhibit at the Salon came in 1863. He won the Prix de Rome in 1866, for his intaglio work, and spent four years at the Villa Medici. In 1869, he made a visit to Spain to copy the masterworks of Diego Vélazquez.  

Not long after his return to France, the Franco-Prussian War began. During the Siege of Paris, he attempted to enlist. Later, during the Commune, he was able to remain in Paris by taking refuge in the studios of his teacher, Bouguereau, who had fled to La Rochelle.  

In 1883, he was named a Knight in the Legion of Honor. Two years later, he was the founder of a new "Société des aquafortistes français", which came under the artistic direction of Flameng.

He was awarded a silver medal at the Exposition Universelle of 1889, and a Grand Prize at the Exposition of 1900. During that same period, he was named a professor of engraving at the École des Beaux-Arts. In 1911, he was elected to the Académie des Beaux-Arts, where he took Seat #4, succeeding Oscar Roty (deceased).

In addition to his reproductions, he provided illustrations for works by Arsène Houssaye, Bernardin de Saint-Pierre, and Benvenuto Cellini, as well as frontispieces for volumes of the Almanach des spectacles; issued by the Librairie des bibliophiles from 1902 to 1913.

References

Further reading 
 Henri Beraldi, Les Graveurs du XIXe siècle, volume IX, Paris. L. Conquet, 1889, pg.13
 Philippe Le Bomin (Ed.), Hommage à Frédéric Laguillermie (1841-1934) : graveur - aquafortiste - peintre, exhibition catalogue, Galerie de la Nacelle à Aubergenville, Chambourcy, ESAT l'atelier, 2009

External links 

1841 births
1934 deaths
French etchers
French illustrators
Prix de Rome winners
Recipients of the Legion of Honour
Members of the Académie des beaux-arts
Artists from Paris